The National Collegiate Baseball Writers Association (NCBWA) is an association of baseball writers, broadcasters, and publicists in the United States.  It was founded in 1962.

The NCBWA compiles a preseason ranking of the top 35 teams in the nation, as voted on by its members.  In addition, weekly rankings of the top 30 teams are released throughout the season and after the College World Series.

The NCBWA awards NCBWA preseason All-American awards, the Dick Howser Trophy (Player of the Year), Regional Players of the Year awards, and All-America awards.

Also the National Coach of the Year is awarded by NCBWA.

National Coach of the Year

Wilbur Snypp Award

The NCBWA's "Wilbur Snypp Award for contributions to college baseball" plaque memorializes longtime Ohio State sports information director and NCBWA founder, the late Wilbur (Bill) Snypp. Snypp was a noted contributor to the writers' organization, which was initiated in 1962, as well as an officer in the group. The NCBWA/Wilbur Snypp Award yearly honors a professional for contributions to the sport of college baseball. Voting is conducted by a panel of previous winners, who include past NCAA College World Series directors, College Sports Information Directors of America Hall of Fame members, decorated media members and others.

Past Wilbur Snypp Award winners include:
 1975 – Wilbur Snypp, Ohio State
 1976 – Bill Esposito, St. John's
 1977 – Phil Langan, Cornell
 1978 – John Geis, Southern Conference
 1979 – Hank Schomber, Georgia Southern
 1980 – Bob Culp, Western Michigan
 1981 – Lou Pavlovich Sr., Collegiate Baseball
 1982 – Tom Price, South Carolina
 1983 – Bob Bradley, Clemson
 1984 – Robert Williams, Omaha World-Herald
 1985 – Jerry Miles, NCAA
 1986 – Larry Keefe, Seton Hall
 1987 – Tom Rowen, San Jose Mercury-News
 1988 – Fred Gerardi, KESY Radio, Omaha
 1989 – Jim Wright, NCAA
 1990 – Steve Weller, SIU-Edwardsville
 1991 – Bill Little, University of Texas
 1992 – Kirk Bohls, Austin American-Statesman
 1993 – Bo Carter, Southwest Conference
 1994 – Lou Pavlovich Jr., Collegiate Baseball
 1995 – Steve Pivovar, Omaha World-Herald
 1996 – Gary Johnson, NCAA
 1997 – Dave Wohlhueter, Cornell
 1998 – Allan Simpson, Baseball America
 1999 – Alan Cannon, Texas A&M University
 2000 – Jim Callis, Baseball America
 2001 – Dick Case, USA Baseball
 2002 – Russ Anderson, Conference USA
 2003 – John Manuel, BASEBALL AMERICA 
 2004 – Dana Heiss Grodin, USA TODAY Sports Weekly 
 2005 – Dennis Poppe, NCAA 
 2006 – Mike Montoro, Southern Miss 
 2007 – Barry Allen, Alabama 
 2008 – Mike Patrick, ESPN 
 2009 – Al Chase, Honolulu Star-Bulletin
 2010 – Lou Spry, NCAA 
 2011 – Jeremy Mills, ESPN/D1Baseball.com
 2012 – Eric Olson, Associated Press
 2013 – J.D. Hamilton, NCAA
 2014 – John Sullivan, Rice
 2015 – David Feaster, Dick Howser Trophy
 2016 – Ralph Zobell, BYU
 2017 – Aaron Fitt, D1Baseball
 2018 – Kyle Peterson, D1Baseball and Espn
 2019 – Jim Ellis, Mississippi State
 2020 – Malcolm Gray, East Carolina
 2021 – Kevin Kugler, Westwood One

See also
College Baseball All-America Team
List of college baseball awards
Baseball awards #U.S. college baseball
Baseball Writers' Association of America (BBWAA)
National Sportscasters and Sportswriters Association
Pro Basketball Writers Association
United States Basketball Writers Association (college)
Football Writers Association of America (college)
Pro Football Writers Association
Professional Hockey Writers Association

References

External links
NCBWA official website

College baseball mass media in the United States
 
Baseball organizations
American sports journalism organizations
Journalism-related professional associations
Organizations established in 1962